Michael Coffie Boampong is the member of parliament for the constituency. He was elected on the ticket of the National Democratic Congress (NDC) won a majority of 14,605 votes to become the MP. He also was the incumbent MP before the 2008 elections.

See also
List of Ghana Parliament constituencies

References 

Parliamentary constituencies in the Western Region (Ghana)